Bishop Philippe Ranaivomanana (12 May 1949 – 6 September 2022) was a Madagascan Roman Catholic prelate who served as the Bishop of Ihosy. He was ordained priest on 16 October 1977. He was appointed and confirmed as bishop in January 1999. He was appointed Bishop of Antsirabe on 13 November 2009.

See also
Catholic Church in Madagascar

References

External links
 Profile of Bishop Ranaivomanana

1949 births
2022 deaths
Bishops appointed by Pope John Paul II
Bishops appointed by Pope Benedict XVI
21st-century Roman Catholic bishops in Madagascar
Malagasy Roman Catholic bishops
Roman Catholic bishops of Ihosy
Roman Catholic bishops of Antsirabé